The Trabzon Subregion (TR90) is a statistical subregion in the eastern Black Sea region of Turkey.

Provinces 

 Trabzon Province (TR901)
 Ordu Province (TR902)
 Giresun Province (TR903)
 Rize Province (TR904)
 Artvin Province (TR905)
 Gümüşhane Province (TR906)

See also 
 NUTS of Turkey

External links 
TURKSTAT

References 
 ESPON Database

Statistical subregions of Turkey